Vadim Khomitsky (born July 21, 1982) is a Russian former professional ice hockey defenceman who is currently an assistant coach for HC Sochi in the Kontinental Hockey League (KHL) with whom he last played for.

Khomitsky was drafted 123rd overall in the 2000 NHL Entry Draft by the Dallas Stars. He spent four seasons with CSKA Moscow before signing with the Stars organization. He played 16 games over two seasons for the Iowa Stars in the American Hockey League, splitting his time in Russia with Khimik Mytishchi.

Personal life
In 2006, he married former ice skating champion Maria Butyrskaya. She is a figure skater who, in 1998, had posed for the Russian edition of Playboy magazine. They have two children together.

Career statistics

Regular season and playoffs

International

References

External links

1982 births
Ak Bars Kazan players
Atlant Moscow Oblast players
Avangard Omsk players
HC CSKA Moscow players
Dallas Stars draft picks
HC Khimik Voskresensk players
Iowa Stars players
Living people
Russian ice hockey defencemen
HC Sochi players
Torpedo Nizhny Novgorod players
People from Voskresensk
Sportspeople from Moscow Oblast